Maksim Stanislavovich Rokhmistrov (also transliterated as Maxim Rokhmistrov; born January 5, 1968) is a member of the State Duma of Russia for the Liberal Democratic Party of Russia. Rokhmistrov is Deputy Chairman of the Duma Committee on Property, and was previously chairman of the Secretariat of the Deputy Chairman of the State Duma.  

1968 births
Living people
People from Kirzhachsky District
Liberal Democratic Party of Russia politicians
Fourth convocation members of the State Duma (Russian Federation)
Fifth convocation members of the State Duma (Russian Federation)
Sixth convocation members of the State Duma (Russian Federation)